Glen Weldon Stewart (September 29, 1912 – February 11, 1997) was a Major League Baseball infielder.

Sources

Major League Baseball infielders
New York Giants (NL) players
Philadelphia Phillies players
Greenwood Giants players
Fort Smith Giants players
Jersey City Giants players
Knoxville Smokies players
Los Angeles Angels (minor league) players
Montreal Royals players
Oakland Oaks (baseball) players
Hollywood Stars players
Memphis Chickasaws players
Hot Springs Bathers players
Wisconsin Rapids White Sox players
Jackson Generals (KITTY League) players
Baseball players from Tennessee
1912 births
1997 deaths